Crassispira eurynome is a species of sea snail, a marine gastropod mollusk in the family Pseudomelatomidae.

Description
The length of the shell attains 11.2 mm, its diameter 5.2 mm.

(Original description) The small shell is slender and acute. It is dark brown with a whitish peripheral and a less obvious basal band. The blunt protoconch consists of two whorls. It is polished and reddish brown. It is followed by six subsequent whorls.  The anal fasciole on the spire is depressed, very minutely spirally striated with a single fine thread near the posterior edge which is appressed at the suture. Other spiral sculpture consists of fine striae and three stronger threads with wider interspaces on the base.  The siphonal canal has about half a dozen
smaller closer threads. The axial sculpture consists of nine oval prominent nodules on the periphery, which may in some specimens be bisected by an incised spiral line. The incremental lines are not prominent. The aperture rs rather wide and short. The deep anal sulcus is deep, with a small subsutural callus. The outer lip is sharp edged, with a small varix, internally not lirate. The siphonal canal is short, wide, deep, with a perceptible siphonal fasciole and slightly recurved.

Distribution
This species occurs in the Pacific Ocean from Acapulco, Mexico to Panama

References

External links
 H. A. Pilsbry and H. N. Lowe, West Mexican and Central American Mollusks Collected by H. N. Lowe, 1929-31; Proceedings of the Academy of Natural Sciences of Philadelphia Vol. 84 (1932), pp. 33-144
 
 
 James H. McLean & Roy Poorman, A Revised Classification of the Family Turridae, with the Proposal of New Subfamilies, Genera, and Subgenera from the Eastern Pacific; The Veliger  vol. 14, 1971

eurynome
Gastropods described in 1919